The Beijing–Hong Kong and Macau Expressway, designated as G4 and commonly referred to as the Jinggang'ao Expressway is a -long expressway that connects the Chinese cities of Beijing and Shenzhen, in Guangdong province, at the border with Hong Kong. The expressway terminates at the Huanggang Port Control Point in Shenzhen, opposite the Lok Ma Chau border control point in Hong Kong.

Route

Beijing
The expressway begins at the interchange with the southwestern section of 3rd Ring Road, known as Liuheqiao Bridge, in Beijing. It firstly heads west, passing through the 4th Ring Road at Yuegezhuang, and then approaches a heavily industrialized area, the Xidaokou area near Shougang. On the way out of Beijing the expressway passes through the famous Luguoqiao area, home of the Marco Polo Bridge and Wanping, marking where the Second Sino-Japanese War began in 1937. The expressway also links Beijing to the Zhoukoudian Peking Man cave, as well as Yunju Temple. 

The expressway is free of charge in Beijing urban area, and then becomes tolled after Dujiakan Toll Station. The expressway then heads south, passing through Liangxiang in Fangshan, before leaving Beijing near Liulihe.

Hebei
 Baoding
 Shijiazhuang
 Xingtai
 Handan

Henan
 Anyang
 Xinxiang
 Zhengzhou
 Xuchang
 Luohe
 Zhumadian
 Xinyang

Hubei

 Xiaogan
 Wuhan
 Xianning

Hunan
 Yueyang
 Changsha
 Zhuzhou
 Hengyang
 Chenzhou

Guangdong
 Shaoguan
 Guangzhou
 Shenzhen

The expressway ends at Huanggang Port, Shenzhen, connected with the road to Hong Kong.

History

The Expressway began as the Jingshi Expressway linking Beijing to Shijiazhuang, Hebei. Construction of this  section began in April 1986 and was opened in full in 1993. This first section was previously numbered G030.

Exit list

References

AH1
Expressways in Hebei
Expressways in Henan
Expressways in Hubei
Expressways in Hunan
Expressways in Beijing
Expressways in Guangdong
04